Viola is a village in Richland (mostly) and Vernon Counties in the U.S. state of Wisconsin, United States. The population was 699 at the 2010 census. Of this, 477 were in Richland County, and 222 were in Vernon County.

Geography
Viola is located at  (43.507552, -90.670178).

The zip code is 54664.

Demographics

2010 census
As of the census of 2010, there were 699 people, 279 households, and 184 families living in the village. The racial makeup of the village was 98.6% White, 0.6% African American, 0.3% from other races, and 0.6% from two or more races. Hispanic or Latino of any race were 0.6% of the population.

There were 279 households, of which 30.8% had children under the age of 18 living with them, 50.2% were married couples living together, 11.5% had a female householder with no husband present, 4.3% had a male householder with no wife present, and 34.1% were non-families. 27.2% of all households were made up of individuals, and 13.3% had someone living alone who was 65 years of age or older. The average household size was 2.51 and the average family size was 3.06.

The median age in the village was 37.8 years. 27.2% of residents were under the age of 18; 7.7% were between the ages of 18 and 24; 23% were from 25 to 44; 25.1% were from 45 to 64; and 16.9% were 65 years of age or older. The gender makeup of the village was 47.9% male and 52.1% female.

2000 census
As of the census of 2000, there were 667 people, 290 households, and 185 families living in the village. The population density was 632.9 people per square mile (245.3/km2). There were 319 housing units at an average density of 302.7 per square mile (117.3/km2). The racial makeup of the village was 98.95% White, 0.15% Native American, 0.30% Asian, 0.15% from other races, and 0.45% from two or more races. Hispanic or Latino of any race were 1.20% of the population.

There were 290 households, out of which 24.8% had children under the age of 18 living with them, 49.7% were married couples living together, 9.7% had a female householder with no husband present, and 35.9% were non-families. 31.0% of all households were made up of individuals, and 16.9% had someone living alone who was 65 years of age or older. The average household size was 2.30 and the average family size was 2.88.

In the village, the population was spread out, with 22.0% under the age of 18, 8.4% from 18 to 24, 23.7% from 25 to 44, 24.0% from 45 to 64, and 21.9% who were 65 years of age or older. The median age was 43 years. For every 100 females, there were 92.8 males. For every 100 females age 18 and over, there were 85.7 males.

The median income for a household in the village was $28,068, and the median income for a family was $34,286. Males had a median income of $28,583 versus $17,188 for females. The per capita income for the village was $17,265. About 12.9% of families and 16.9% of the population were below the poverty line, including 27.5% of those under age 18 and 9.4% of those age 65 or over.

Education
 The Kickapoo High School is the local public high school.

Notable people

Frank J. Cosgrove, Wisconsin politician, farmer, and businessman, was born in Viola.
Robert H. DeLap, Wisconsin politician, soldier, and physician, lived in Viola.
Russel B. Nye, educator, historian and 1945 Pulitzer Prize-winning author, was born in Viola.

References

External links

 Kickapoo Area School District
 Historic Viola, Wisconsin

Villages in Richland County, Wisconsin
Villages in Vernon County, Wisconsin
Villages in Wisconsin